IJMS may refer to:
 International Journal of Mass Spectrometry
 International Journal of Molecular Sciences
 International Journal of Mormon Studies
 International Journal of Motorcycle Studies
 Iranian Journal of Medical Sciences
 Indian Journal of Geo-Marine Sciences
 The Interim Joint Tactical Information Distribution System (JTIDS) Message Specification (IJMS) used by the Joint Tactical Information Distribution System